Mandalgovi Airport   is a public airport located in Mandalgovi, the capital of the Dundgovi Province in Mongolia.

See also 
 List of airports in Mongolia

External links 
world airport codes Mandalgovi

Airports in Mongolia